Radoslav is a common Slavic masculine given name, derived from rad- ("happy, eager, to care") and slava ("glory, fame"), both very common in Slavic dithematic names. It roughly means "eager glory". It is known since the Middle Ages. The earliest known Radoslav was a 9th-century Serbian ruler. It may refer to:

People
 Radoslav Bachev (born 1981), Bulgarian footballer
 Radoslav Batak (born 1977), Montenegrin footballer
 Radoslav Brđanin (born 1948), Serbian war criminal
 Radoslav Brzobohatý (1932–2012), Czech actor
 Radoslav Hecl (born 1974), Slovak ice hockey player
 Radoslav Katičić (born 1930), Croatian linguist, historian and culturologist
 Radoslav Kováč (born 1979), Czech footballer and manager
 Radoslav Kvapil (born 1934), Czech pianist and composer
 Radoslav Látal (born 1970), Czech footballer
 Radoslav Lorković (born 1958), Croatian born musician
 Radoslav "Rasho" Nesterović (born 1976), Slovenian basketball player
 Radoslav Rangelov (born 1985), Bulgarian footballer
 Radoslav Rochallyi (born 1980), Slovak writer
 Radoslav Samardžić (born 1970), Serbian footballer
 Radoslav Stojanović, professor of law at the University of Belgrade and former member of the Founding Committee of the Democratic Party
 Radoslav Suchý (born 1976), Slovak ice hockey player
 Radoslav Suslekov (born 1974), Bulgarian boxer
 Radoslav Zabavník (born 1980), Slovak footballer
 Radoslav Židek (born 1981), Slovakian snowboarder
 Radoslav (painter), Serbian 15th-century painter

Royalty and nobility
 Radoslav of Serbia, Prince of Serbia (r. 800–822)
 Radoslav of Duklja, Prince of Duklja (r. 1146–48)
 Stefan Radoslav (c. 1192 – c. 1234), king of Serbia from 1228 to 1233
 Radoslav Hlapen (fl. 1350–71), Serbian magnate
 Radoslav, 13th–14th-century Bulgarian sebastokrator
 Radoslav Čelnik, 16th-century duke (voivode) of Srem

Other 
 Radoslav Gospel, 1429 manuscript by Serbian scribe

See also
 Radosław (disambiguation)
 Radosav
 Radič
 Radosavljević and Radoslavljević, patronymic surnames

References

Czech masculine given names
Bulgarian masculine given names
Slovak masculine given names
Serbian masculine given names
Slavic masculine given names
Masculine given names